Lazybrook and Timbergrove Manor (collectively, "Lazybrook/Timbergrove") are two adjoining, deed-restricted neighborhoods located approximately 7 miles northwest of Downtown Houston, Texas.  Located inside the 610 Loop and just west of the Houston Heights, Lazybrook and Timbergrove Manor are situated along the wooded banks of White Oak Bayou in the near northwest quadrant of the city.

History 
Originally settled by German farmers in the late 1800s, the area was the site of a major oil discovery in the 1930s known as "Eureka." Reminders of that distant past remain in a nearby railroad yard, still called the Eureka Yard, and one of the original churches, built by early settlers in 1891, St. John's German Lutheran Church, that still exists, although it now resides in Downtown's Sam Houston Park.

In the pre-freeway period after World War II, this area remained largely wooded and undeveloped while suburban growth was exploding in every other direction of Houston. However, by the 1950s, residential development finally emerged in the area beginning with Timbergrove Manor, followed by Lazybrook.  Timbergrove Manor was named for the many pine trees sheltering the area, while Lazybrook was named for White Oak Bayou, which forms the neighborhood's eastern boundary.

In 2011 the Lazybrook/Timbergrove Super Neighborhood was formed.

Cityscape 
Today, the community primarily consists of mid-century, one-story ranch style brick homes.  Lazybrook/Timbergrove is enjoying a renaissance as demand increases for close-in housing in Houston.   Residents have seen a transition as original-owner, retired neighbors have moved out and young professionals have moved in. Besides the anchor communities of Lazybrook and Timbergrove Manor, upscale townhome developments such as Heritage Creek, Timbergrove Heights, Timbergrove Terrace, Timbergrove Point, and Timbergrove Gardens are within the larger neighborhood. The northwestern corner Lazybrook/Timbergrove extending outside of Loop 610 on both sides of US 290, includes Brookwood, a large lot subdivision, the Brookhollow business park, Northwest Mall and Houston Independent School District's (HISD) headquarters and Delmar Stadium complex.

Government 
Lazybrook/Timbergrove is located in the city limits of Houston and Houston City Council District C.

In October 2011, the Houston City Council officially recognized the Lazybrook/Timbergrove Super Neighborhood Council.  Timbergrove Manor is divided into two distinct subdivisions, each governed by a separate homeowners association - the Timbergrove Manor Civic Club and the Timbergrove Manor Neighborhood Association. Together with the Lazybrook Civic Club, these active associations were instrumental in the city of Houston's designation of the Lazybrook/Timbergrove Super Neighborhood. Deed restrictions are enforced throughout, and the groups handle landscaping of esplanades and a Citizens on Patrol security plan.

Education 

Lazybrook/Timbergrove is served by Houston Independent School District. The neighborhood elementary school is Sinclair Elementary,  although portion of Timbergrove Manor are zoned to Love Elementary in the Houston Heights. Sinclair Elementary was named after Thomas Albert Sinclair, founder of the Heights Hospital.  Middle schools that serve Lazybrook/Timbergrove are Frank Black Middle School  and Hamilton Middle School.   Most area students are zoned to Waltrip High School  in the Oak Forest neighborhood, with a small portion of Timbergrove Manor students zoned to Reagan High School in the Houston Heights.

Parks and Recreation 

The City of Houston operates parks within and around the Lazybrook/Timbergrove. Parks in the area include:
 Lorraine Cherry Nature Preserve
 Timbergrove Manor Park
 Jaycee Park
 T.C. Jester Parkway

The West White Oak Bayou Trail begins in Timbergrove Manor and runs along the banks of the bayou, parallel to T. C. Jester Boulevard, from 11th Street, through Lazybrook and Oak Forest. The White Oak Bayou Trail provides bicyclists and pedestrians a 7.4-mile (11.9 km) long mostly concrete and asphalt trail. Passing through several parks, the trail is lighted and includes protective railings in some areas.

References

External links 
 Lazybrook Civic Club
 Timbergrove Manor Civic Club
 Timbergrove Manor Neighborhood Association
 Super Neighborhood 14 - Lazybrook / Timbergrove
 Super Neighborhood 14 Official Webpage

Neighborhoods in Houston